Astrid in Wonderland is a Belgian reality television series airing on the Belgian channel VIJFtv and in the Netherlands on NET5 and was first on air on 2 September 2011.

Overview
Starring:
 Astrid Bryan (Astrid Maria Maurice Nuyens Bryan Jr.)
 Laurens Nuyens: brother of Astrid
 A. John A. Bryan Jr.
 Kathryn Lebowitz
 NancyJane Goldston
 Bart Cops
 Kate Gaffney
 Jaden Huter
 Corina Marinescu
 Ashlee McNulty

References

External links
https://web.archive.org/web/20110924084124/http://www.vijftv.be/programma_astridinw.php
http://astridbryan.com/ 
http://www.imdb.com/title/tt1841982/

Flemish television shows
Belgian reality television series
2010s Belgian television series
2011 Belgian television series debuts
2013 Belgian television series endings